Eby Shoe Corporation, also known as Fleet-Air Corporation, is a historic factory building complex located at Ephrata, Lancaster County, Pennsylvania. The property includes three contributing buildings to the listing.  Building "A" was built about 1900, and is a four-story, gable roofed brick building with a two-story flat roofed addition.  Building "B" was built in 1919-1920, and is a three-story, gable roofed brick building measuring 48 feet wide and 115 feet deep.  Building "C" was built in 1923, and is a four-story, steel frame building with a brick exterior.  It measures 48 feet wide and 180 feet deep.  The Eby Shoe Corporation closed in 1985.

It was listed on the National Register of Historic Places in 1989.

References

Industrial buildings and structures on the National Register of Historic Places in Pennsylvania
Industrial buildings completed in 1900
Industrial buildings completed in 1920
Industrial buildings completed in 1923
Buildings and structures in Lancaster County, Pennsylvania
National Register of Historic Places in Lancaster County, Pennsylvania